Chatkhil Government Girls' High School is a government high school located in the Chatkhil town of Chatkhil Upazila, Noakhali, Bangladesh.

References

Schools in Noakhali District
Girls' schools in Bangladesh
High schools in Bangladesh
Chatkhil Upazila